Ryan Elliott (born 1997) is an Irish hurler who plays for Antrim Senior Championship club Dunloy and at inter-county level with the Antrim senior hurling team. He usually lines out as a goalkeeper.

Career

A member of the Dunloy club, Elliott first came to prominence with the club's senior team that won County Championship titles in 2017 and 2019. He made his first appearance on the inter-county scene as a member of the Antrim under-21 team during the 2018 Leinster Championship. Elliott made his debut with the Antrim senior hurling team during the 2018 National Hurling League and lined out in goal for their 2020 Joe McDonagh Cup success.

Honours

Dunloy
Antrim Senior Hurling Championship: 2017, 2019

Antrim
Joe McDonagh Cup: 2020

References

External links
Ryan Elliott profile at the Antrim GAA website

1997 births
Living people
Dunloy hurlers
Antrim inter-county hurlers
Hurling goalkeepers